Carnaval fi Dachra is a 1994 Algerian comedy film directed by Mohamed Oukassi.

Makhlouf Bombardier, unusual, decides to be elected mayor of a dechra (village). So he surrounds himself with trusted partners to organize a great campaign for his election. Bombardier became the mayor of the village and is organizing an international film festival to compete at the Carthage festival. In his action, he is pursued by the Court of Auditors for embezzlement. So, his ultimate goal is to become the president.

Cast
 Othmane Ariouat - Makhlouf Bombardier
 Salah Aougrout - Cheikh Brahim
 Khider Hmida - Si Benouna
 Lakhder Boukhers - El Alouch
 Mustapha Himoune - Aissa El Okli
 Hamid Achouri - El Mabrouk
 Atika Toubal - La femme courte

See also
 List of Algerian films

References

1994 films
1990s Arabic-language films
Algerian comedy films
1994 comedy films